Going Inside is the second EP by John Frusciante, released on March 5, 2001 (Frusciante's 31st birthday.) The tracks "Time Is Nothing" and "The Last Hymn" are B-sides from To Record Only Water for Ten Days, although "Time Is Nothing" can also be found on the leaked demos of To Record Only Water for Ten Days. "So Would Have I" and "Beginning Again" are present on the downloadable album From the Sounds Inside. Other music that John Frusciante has released consist of 12 albums and 7 EPs. He has his first big breakthrough with the Red Hot Chili Peppers band in 1991. John Frusciante released his first solo album, Niandra Lades and Usually Just a T-Shirt, in 1994, and his second album, Smile from the Streets You Hold, in 1997. Both solo albums were released during and after John Frusciante's battle with drug addiction, though he denied he was on heroin while releasing his first solo album.

Track listing

References 

“John Frusciante.” Wikipedia, Wikimedia Foundation, 8 Apr. 2021, en.wikipedia.org/wiki/John_Frusciante.

John Frusciante albums
2001 EPs